Scott L. Wyatt is an American attorney, politician, and academic administrator serving as the 16th president of Southern Utah University. He previously served as the 15th president of Snow College and as a member of the Utah State Legislature.

Education 
Wyatt has a Bachelor of Science degree in philosophy and economics from Utah State University and a Juris Doctor from the S.J. Quinney College of Law at the University of Utah. Wyatt was admitted to the Utah bar 2 October 1990.

Career 
During his law career, Wyatt served as a prosecutor for Cache County, Utah. From 2005 to 2007, Wyatt was a member of the Utah House of Representatives from 2005 to 2007, representing the 5th district. During his tenure in the House, Wyatt was a member of the House Political Subdivisions Committee, Judiciary Committee, House Business and Labor Committee, and Higher Education Appropriations Subcommittee. Wyatt was the president of Snow College from 2007 to 2013.

References

Living people
Members of the Utah House of Representatives
Utah State University alumni
Snow College faculty
Southern Utah University faculty
Year of birth missing (living people)